John Brian Taylor (born 7 October 1931) was an English professional footballer who played as a goalkeeper.

Career
Born in Rossington, Taylor played for Sheffield Wednesday, Doncaster Rovers, Worksop Town, Leeds United, King's Lynn and Bradford (Park Avenue) and Bradford (Park Avenue).

References

1931 births
Date of death missing
English footballers
Sheffield Wednesday F.C. players
Doncaster Rovers F.C. players
Worksop Town F.C. players
Leeds United F.C. players
King's Lynn F.C. players
Bradford (Park Avenue) A.F.C. players
English Football League players
Association football goalkeepers